Dalbeg is a rural town and locality in the Shire of Burdekin, Queensland, Australia.

Geography

Dalbeg farming community located inland from the townships of Ayr and Home Hill. Situated on the banks of the Burdekin River, it is a fertile area famous for growing sugar cane and vegetables.

On many maps there appears to be a road crossing the Burdekin River at Dalbeg. In fact this was once a fording point. The earliest explorers coming from the Gulf region (The Plains of Promise) used Expedition Pass through the mountains to arrive at the banks of the Burdekin River at this fording point where they then crossed into Strathalbyn Station. The river can no longer be forded at this point.

History

The area was originally known as Akala until the Queensland Surveyor General changed the name to Dalbeg, the name of a pastoral run taken up by pastoralist James Hall Scott on 28 May 1863.

In the early 1950s, an irrigation scheme was established in Dalbeg, Millaroo and Clare to provide irrigated blocks for soldier settlers. Although the original intention was that the crops would be tobacco and rice, the settlers preferred to grow other crops, such as sugarcane, which are more water-intensive.

Dalbeg Post Office opened on 1 December 1956 and closed in 1971.

Dalbeg State School opened on 4 July 1955; it closed on 1999. It was at 45-63 Delpratt Street.

Dalbeg was once home to the North Queensland Soaring Centre (then the Burdekin Soaring Club).

Education 
There are no schools in Dalbeg. The nearest government primary school is Millaroo State School in neighbouring Millaroo to the north. There are no government secondary schools nearby; the options are distance education or boarding school.

References

External links 

Burdekin OnLine Web Site

Towns in Queensland
Shire of Burdekin
Localities in Queensland